Via or VIA may refer to the following:

Science and technology 
 MOS Technology 6522, Versatile Interface Adapter
 Via (moth), a genus of moths in the family Noctuidae
 Via (electronics), a through-connection
 VIA Technologies, a Taiwanese manufacturer of electronics
 Virtual Interface Adapter, a network protocol
 Virtual Interface Architecture, a networking standard used in high-performance computing

Education 
 VIA Vancouver Institute for the Americas, an organization dedicated to education for sustainable development, since 1998 operating in Canada 
 VIA University College, a university college (Danish: professionshøjskole), since 2008 established in Denmark
 VIA, Association of Information Sciences (Dutch: VIA Vereniging Informatiewetenschappen Amsterdam), at the University of Amsterdam, in the Netherlands

Transportation 
 The name for a Roman road, e.g., Via Appia
 VIA was the ICAO airline designator for Venezuelan airline Viasa (1960-1977)
 VIA Metropolitan Transit, a mass transit agency serving San Antonio, Texas, United States
 Via Rail, rail operator in Canada
 Via Transportation, a transportation software technology company based in New York City
 Rokospol Via, a Czech aircraft design
 Air VIA, originally Varna International Airways, a Bulgarian airline (2000-2017)
 VIA Airways (est. 2017), rebranded as Fly2Sky Airlines in 2019, a Bulgarian airline, successor to Air VIA
 Via Airlines, an American airline (2014-2019)
 Via Cargo, a polish transportation company

Other 
Via (surname)
Vià, a French television network
 The Via Foundation, Nadace Via, Prague, Czech Republic
 Values in Action Inventory
 VIA (Volunteers In Asia), US organization
 The U.S. stock ticker symbol for Viacom class A shares
 Volunteers in Africa Foundation
 VIA music (ВИА), the Russian abbreviation of Вокально-Инструментальный Ансамбль Vokal'no-Instrumental'nyy ansambl (Vocal-Instrumental Ensemble), e.g. VIA Gra (ВИА Гра)
 A brand of instant coffee made by Starbucks
 Via (Volumes album), 2011
 Via (Thalia Zedek album)

See also 
 Viaduct, a kind of bridge
 Vias (disambiguation)